Dai Davies may refer to:

 Dai Davies (sportsman) (1880–1944), rugby union, rugby league, and association footballer for Llanelli (RU), Wales (RL), Swinton, Wales (Soccer) and Bolton Wanderers
 Dai Davies (cricketer) (1896–1976), first-class cricketer for Glamorgan and Wales, and Test umpire
 Dai Davies (trade unionist) (1909–1998), Labour Party official and general secretary of the ISTC
 Dai Davies (rugby union) (1925–2003), rugby union footballer of the 1940s and 1950s for British Lions, Wales, Penygraig, Somerset Police, British Police, Somerset, and Barbarian F.C.
 Dai Davies (footballer, born 1948) (1948–2021), Everton F.C., Wrexham A.F.C. and Wales international goalkeeper
 Dai Davies (politician) (born 1959), independent MP for Blaenau Gwent, Wales 2006–2010
 Dai Davies (journalist) (1938–2008), English-born Welsh sports journalist
 Dai Davies, fictional minor character in the webcomic Scary Go Round

See also
 David Davies (disambiguation)